Akiel Julien (born October 31, 1996) is a Canadian actor. He is known for his role as LaTroy in the teen drama series The Next Step, for which he was a Canadian Screen Award nominee for Best Performance in a Children's or Youth Program or Series at the 6th Canadian Screen Awards in 2018.

Career 
Julien has appeared in Utopia Falls, The Parker Andersons, Frankie Drake Mysteries, Wayne, American Gods, What We Do in the Shadows, and The Boys. In 2022, he was named to host one of the advance gala presentations for the 10th Canadian Screen Awards.

Filmography

Film

Television

References

External links

Living people
21st-century Canadian male actors
Black Canadian male actors
Canadian male film actors
Canadian male television actors
1996 births